This is a list of official vehicles of the president of the United States, past and present.

State vehicles

1939 Lincoln K-series Sunshine Special, used by Franklin D. Roosevelt.
1942 Lincoln Custom, used by Franklin D. Roosevelt and Harry Truman.
1950 Lincoln Cosmopolitan, used by Harry Truman, Dwight Eisenhower, and John F. Kennedy. Currently on display at the Henry Ford Museum, this vehicle was the first to use a bulletproof "bubbletop" canopy, which was added in 1954. The car remained in service until 1967.
1961 Lincoln Continental SS-100-X, used by John F. Kennedy. Currently on display at the Henry Ford Museum.
1965 Lincoln Continental, used by Lyndon B. Johnson.
1969 Lincoln Continental, used by Richard Nixon.
1972 Lincoln Continental, used by Gerald Ford, Jimmy Carter, and Ronald Reagan. It was ordered as a 1970 model (it has a 1970 serial number) with the 1972 body style, and updated later to match 1977-1979 models. It was involved in the 1975 assassination attempt of President Ford, as well as the 1981 assassination attempt of President Reagan. It is currently on display at the Henry Ford Museum.
1983 Cadillac Fleetwood Brougham, used by Ronald Reagan.
1989 Lincoln Town Car, used by George H. W. Bush.
1993 Cadillac Fleetwood, used by Bill Clinton. This was the first Cadillac that was designed from the ground up for use as a state car. Previous models were modified production units. It is on display at the Clinton Presidential Library.
2001 Cadillac de Ville used by George W. Bush
2005 Cadillac DTS Presidential State Car, used by George W. Bush and Barack Obama.
2009 Cadillac "Cadillac One", used by Barack Obama and Donald Trump.
2011 Ground Force One, a Prevost Car chassis-based bus used by Barack Obama.
2018 Cadillac used by Donald Trump and Joe Biden. Road & Track reported that "the design appears to be a simple evolution of the old model with more current Cadillac design cues, like an Escalade sedan. It weighs between 15,000–20,000 pounds. (6,800–9,100 kg).

Yachts
USS Despatch (1873? – 1891), the first presidential yacht; lost off Virginia in 1891
USS Dolphin (1897 – 1920), used by William McKinley and later Theodore Roosevelt
USS Sylph (1902 – 1929)
USS Mayflower (1905 – 1929), used by every president from Theodore Roosevelt to Calvin Coolidge. 
USS Sequoia (1931 – 1977), used by every president from Herbert Hoover to Jimmy Carter, who ordered the aging yacht sold in 1977
USS Potomac (1936 – 1945), used by Franklin D. Roosevelt
USS Williamsburg (1945 – 1953), used by Harry S. Truman.  Dwight D. Eisenhower retired it as a "symbol of needless luxury".
a yacht variously named:
Lenore II. Truman used it as a tender for the Williamsburg.
Barbara Anne, by Eisenhower. 
Honey Fitz, by John F. Kennedy. The name was retained by Lyndon B. Johnson.
Patricia, by Richard Nixon. It was sold in 1970 to a private individual.
United States Coast Guard cutter/yacht Manitou, chosen by Kennedy in 1962; sold in 1968 to the Harry Lundeburg School of Seamanship.

Aircraft
Although "Air Force One" is commonly used to refer to the president's primary aircraft, the designation is, strictly speaking, a call sign used to identify any U.S. Air Force aircraft the president is aboard, rather than the name of a particular aircraft. (See below.)

Franklin Roosevelt was the first president to fly in an aircraft while in office.  In January 1943 he flew in a Pan American Airways Boeing 314 flying boat, named Dixie Clipper, to Casablanca to meet with British Prime Minister Winston Churchill.  It was soon realized that the president would need a dedicated aircraft and a C-54 transport was converted serve as the presidential aircraft and named Sacred Cow.  Roosevelt made only one trip in the Sacred Cow.  That was to the Yalta Conference in February 1945 to meet with Churchill and Soviet leader Joseph Stalin to make plans for the reconstruction of Europe after the impending Allied victory.

Aircraft used as the primary presidential aircraft:

Sacred Cow, VC-54C used by presidents Roosevelt and Truman from 1945 to 1947.
Independence, VC-118A (46-505) used by presidents Truman and Eisenhower from 1947 to 1953.
Columbine II, VC-121A (48-0610) used by President Eisenhower from 1953 to 1954.
Columbine III, VC-121E (53-7885) used by President Eisenhower from 1954 to 1959.
SAM 970, VC-137A/B (58-6970) used by presidents Eisenhower and Kennedy from 1959 to 1962.
VC-118A, (53-3240) used by President Kennedy from 1961 to 1962.
SAM 26000, VC-137C (62-6000) used by presidents Kennedy, Johnson and Nixon from 1962 to 1972.
SAM 27000 (Spirit of '76), VC-137C (72-7000) used by presidents Nixon, Ford, Carter, Reagan and George H. W. Bush from 1972 to 1990.
SAM 28000, VC-25A (82-8000) used by presidents George H. W. Bush, Clinton, George W. Bush, Obama, Trump, and Biden from 1990 to the present. Its sister aircraft, SAM 29000 (82-9000), serves as the primary backup presidential aircraft.

(The dates shown above are the dates when the aircraft was used as the primary presidential aircraft. Most were retained in service for several years after the dates shown.)

Other presidential aircraft

In addition to the above, a number of other aircraft have been used by presidents for trips of short duration. Below is a listing of aircraft types assigned to the 89th Airlift Wing for use by, or in support of, the president or other senior government officials.

VC-118A (53-3240) – A military variant of the Douglas DC-6, in service from 1947 to 1965. Used to access airfields with shorter runways.
U-4B – Two Aero Commander U-4Bs (55-4647 and 55-4648) were in presidential service from 1955 to 1960.
VC-137A/B – Three VC-137A/Bs (58-6970, 58-6971 and 58-6972), a military variant of the Boeing 707, were in service from 1959 to 1996. These were the first jet aircraft used to transport the president of the United States and also provided transportation to very senior government officials (i.e. first ladies, vice presidents and secretaries of state) during their service.
VC-137C – Four VC-137Cs, a military variant of the Boeing 707, were acquired in 1962 (62-6000), 1972 (72-7000), 1985 (85-6973) and 1987 (85-6974) respectively and served to the early 2000s.  The two acquired in 1962 (62-6000) and 1972 (72-7000) served respectively as the primary presidential aircraft until the acquisition of two VC-25As in 1990.
VC-140B – Six VC-140Bs (61-2488, 61-2489, 61-2490, 61-2491, 61-2492 and 61-2493), a military variant of the Lockheed JetStar, were in service from the early 1960s to the 1980s.
VC-6A - One VC-6A (66-7943), a Beechcraft King Air B90, was used to transport President Johnson between Bergstrom Air Force Base and his family ranch near Johnson City, Texas from 1964 to 1969. 
Boeing VC-135B - Five VC-135 aircraft (62-4125, 62-4126, 62-4127, 62-4129 and 62-4130), converted from KC-135 tankers, were in service with the 89th MAW from 1968 to 1992.  All were converted to other configurations.
VC-9C – Three VC-9Cs (73-1681, 73-1682 and 73-1683), a military variant of the McDonnell Douglas C-9, were in service from the 1976 to 2011.
C-20C – A military variant of the Gulfstream III, upgraded and with secure communications, often utilized as backup aircraft accompanying the VC-25A aircraft when it is operating as Air Force One
C-32 – Four C-32As, a military variant of the (Boeing 757-200), were acquired in 2002 (98-0001, 98-0002, 99-0003 and 99-0004), three more in 2010 (09-0015, 09-0016, 09-0017) and an additional one in 2019 (19-0018). 
C-40B – Two C-40Bs (01-0040 and 01-0041), a military variant of the Boeing 737-700C have been in service since 2002.
C-37A – Three C-37As (one delivered in 2005 and two in 2006), a military variant of the Gulfstream V, are currently in service.

The president and other senior executives have also frequently made use of the Boeing C-17 Globemaster III cargo plane outfitted with "comfort pallets" to provide basic amenities while travelling into war zones undercover with normal non-prioritzed call signs so not to draw attention to the fact that a high value target is in the area. C-17's also typically proceed presidential travel by bringing the presidential limousine, Marine One, and other United States Secret Service vehicles and equipment to an area for a visit.

Call signs

The following air traffic control call signs designate aircraft transporting the president:

Air Force One, any U.S. Air Force aircraft with the president on board.
Marine One, the presidential helicopter.
Army One, usually a helicopter. The Army shared the duty of transporting the president by helicopter with the United States Marine Corps until 1976, when the latter took on sole responsibility.
Navy One, this designation has been used only once, when in 2003 an S-3 Viking airplane flew then President George W. Bush to the aircraft carrier USS Abraham Lincoln.
Coast Guard One; this call sign has not yet been used, although then-Vice President Joe Biden did fly on Coast Guard Two in 2009.
Space Force One; this call sign has not yet been used.
Executive One, any civilian aircraft carrying the president. This designation has been used only once, when in 1973 Richard Nixon flew with a United Airlines DC-10 from Washington Dulles International Airport to Los Angeles International Airport.

Rail cars
United States (1865), constructed in 1863 and 1864. Abraham Lincoln never used the "elaborately appointed" car. After his assassination, his body was transported to Springfield in it.
Ferdinand Magellan (1943–1958, 1984), used by presidents Roosevelt, Truman, Eisenhower and Reagan for his whistlestop across Ohio in 1984.

See also
Transportation of the president of the United States

References

Transportation of the president of the United States
President of the United States
 
Lists relating to the United States presidency
Vehicles of the United States